Ma'n ( / , ; informally transcribed as Man or Maan) is an Arabic male given name, most famously borne by the 8th-century general and hero Ma'n ibn Za'ida, also known for his generosity. The word  has several meanings in Classical Arabic.

People
Ma'n ibn Za'ida, 8th-century Arab general and hero
Ma'n, the ancestor of the Ma'n family
Man Asaad, Syrian weightlifter
Maan Al-Khodari, Saudi footballer
Maan Al-Sanea, Saudi businessman

References

Arabic masculine given names